Masabih al-Sunnah is a collection of hadith by the Persian Shafi'i scholar Abu Muhammad al-Husayn ibn Mas'ud ibn Mubammad al-Farra' al-Baghawi,  from sometime before 516 H. An improved version of this work, Mishkat al-Masabih, has additional hadith, and was the work of another Persian traditionist Al-Tabrizi d. 741H.

Description
The collection is divided into a number of books which are divided into chapters which are further divided into two separate sections, one for Sahih ahadeeth as labeled by him ( from the collections of Bukhari and Muslim), the second section was for hasan ahadeeth according to his own labelling (from Al-Tirmidhi, Abu Dawud and others). Al-Tabrizi would alter certain ahadeeth positions in his own collection.

Features of the Collection 
 Al-Baghawi omitted the isnads of these ahadeeth but kept the names of the Sahaba to whom the ahadith were traced.
 Part of his purpose, as explained in the introduction, was to enlighten Muslims about certain things of which the Quran is silent.
 Contains a grand total of 4434 ahadeeth.
 2434 are from Sahih section: 
325 Sahih Bukhari Only
875 Sahih Muslim Only
1234 from both Sahih Bukhari and Sahih Muslim
 Al-Baghawi tells which ahadeeth from the second section of his work are gharib and da'if
 A number of commentaries were made on this collection. Tuhfat Al-Abrar, Al-Maysir and the commentary by Abd al-Qadir ibn 'Abd Allah al-Suhrawardi.

References 
Mishkat-ul-Masabih (a Summarised Version) Compiled By Wali-ud-din Bin Abdullah Al-Khatib Al-Umari Al-Tabrizi
1568 books obtained by Melvyl, the on line catalog of the University of California library system.

Sunni literature
Sunni hadith collections